Yanev is a surname. Notable people with the surname include:

Aleksandar Yanev (born 1990), Bulgarian basketball player
Demir Yanev, Syrian-born Bulgarian film director
Georgi Yanev (born 1998), Bulgarian football player
Hristo Yanev (born 1979), Bulgarian football manager
Ivelin Yanev (born 1981), Bulgarian football player
Kosta Yanev (born 1983), Bulgarian football player
Krum Yanev (1929–2012), Bulgarian football player
Stefan Yanev (born 1939), Bulgarian football player
Stefan Yanev (born 1960), Bulgarian army officer and politician
Yane Yanev (born 1971), Bulgarian politician
Yordan Yanev (born 1954), Bulgarian long jumper

Bulgarian-language surnames